Alka Tomar is an Indian wrestler.  & who belongs to a Rajput family . Coached by Jabar Singh Som , she became the National Women Wrestling champion of India, and received the bronze medal in Wrestling (59 kg Freestyle) at the Doha Asian Games in 2006. Alka Tomar also received a bronze at the Senior Wrestling Championships in Guangzhou in China 2006.

She also won a Gold Medal at the Commonwealth Games 2010 in Delhi where she competed against Tonya Verbeek of Canada.

Early life 
Alka was born to Nain Singh Tomar and Munni Devi .

References

External links
Alka Tomar in news

Indian female sport wrestlers
Living people
Recipients of the Arjuna Award
Wrestlers at the 2010 Commonwealth Games
Commonwealth Games gold medallists for India
Asian Games medalists in wrestling
Wrestlers at the 2002 Asian Games
Wrestlers at the 2006 Asian Games
Year of birth missing (living people)
World Wrestling Championships medalists
Asian Games bronze medalists for India
Commonwealth Games medallists in wrestling
Sportswomen from Uttar Pradesh
21st-century Indian women
21st-century Indian people
Medalists at the 2006 Asian Games
Asian Wrestling Championships medalists
Medallists at the 2010 Commonwealth Games